Edward Chávez (1917–1995) was an American artist. His work straddled realism, expressionism, and abstraction; often incorporating both elements of modernism and his heritage as a New Mexican hispanic and native artist. He was an artist with the Treasury Relief Art Project during the Great Depression of the 1930s. He also worked for the Section of Painting and Sculpture, painting a mural in the post office in Geneva, Nebraska, in 1941. His painting Colt can be found at MoMa. His work is also included in the collection at the Woodstock Artists Association and Museum.

References

1917 births
1995 deaths
People from Mora County, New Mexico
Painters from New Mexico
20th-century American painters
American male painters
American muralists
Treasury Relief Art Project artists
20th-century American male artists
Hispanic and Latino American people
Section of Painting and Sculpture artists